Stephen or Steven Alexander may refer to:

Stephen Alexander (American football) (born 1975), American football tight end
Steven Alexander (singer), on The Voice UK
Stephen Alexander (astronomer) (1806–1883), astronomer and educator

See also
Steve Alexander (disambiguation)